Bexhill West is a closed station in Bexhill-on-Sea in East Sussex. It was the terminus of the Bexhill West branch of the Hastings Line. It was opened by the South Eastern and Chatham Railway and was operated by the Southern Region of British Railways on closing. The station building still survives as an antiques house. The trackbed and site of the now demolished platforms are now occupied by commercial industrial buildings.

History
A  branch line was ceremonially opened between Crowhurst and Bexhill on 31 May 1902 by the nominally independent Crowhurst, Sidley & Bexhill Railway Company which had been promoted by the Earl De La Warr together with other local businessmen and landowners. The line had the backing of the South Eastern Railway which ran services to the nearby  and St Leonards stations. The branch would offer a quicker route to Bexhill than that already provided by the London, Brighton and South Coast Railway whose own Bexhill station on the Hastings to Brighton line had opened more than fifty years earlier. The branch was absorbed by the South Eastern and Chatham Railway in 1905.

The new Bexhill station was situated in a valley on the west side of Bexhill which had not yet been developed. It was approached by a new road named "Terminus Road" to distinguish it from the "Station Road" which served the LB&SCR's station. A lavish station building was constructed which reflected the SER's ambitions for the line. Designed by C.S. Barry and C.E. Mercer, it was built of yellow and red brick and Bath Stone dressing. Welsh slate was used on the roof which is crowned by a clocktower, and the main entrance features a block-moulded pediment which was carved in situ. The symmetrical building comprised a large and airy booking hall, ticket and parcels offices, a waiting room and ladies toilet, as well as the stationmaster's and inspector's offices. At a right angle to the building stands a smaller block which contained a refreshment room, gents' toilet, porters' and lamp rooms. The uncovered platforms 3 and 4 were rarely used; platform 4 never in fact received any track and platform 3 was soon covered by grass. The station buildings were lit by electricity, whereas the platforms by gas.

Despite the shorter route to London and the impressive station buildings, passengers continued to prefer the LB&SCR's more centrally-located station. In 1917, the Railway Executive Committee ordered the closure of the branch from January 1917. Although goods services began again from November 1917, full passenger services were not restored until March 1919. The 1923 grouping led to the SE&CR becoming part of the Southern Railway which renamed the LB&SCR station "Bexhill Central" whilst the SER's station became simply "Bexhill" and finally "Bexhill West" in November 1929. The Southern arranged for most main line services through  to include three corridor coaches for Bexhill West to avoid the need to change trains, but this still failed to tempt passengers on to the branch. In 1930, consultants engaged by Bexhill Town Council recommended the construction of a link line between the two lines, but nothing came of this nor of the proposal in 1937 to electrify the line at the same time as the Hastings Line. Although now very much referred to as a branch, the line temporarily took on main line status when services on the Hastings Line were temporarily diverted to Bexhill West between 27 November 1949 and 5 June 1950 while Bo-peep tunnel was closed for partial reconstruction. Emergency bus services ran from Crowhurst to St Leonards, Hastings and Bexhill West. The line's push-pull trains were replaced in June 1958 by two-car diesel-electric units which connected with the London to Hastings diesel-electric units at Crowhurst. Sunday services were withdrawn from January 1960. The line's demise was confirmed by its inclusion in the Beeching Report, and it finally closed to all traffic from 15 June 1964.

Present day
The track was lifted in 1965 and the bridge over Down Road and Little Common Road demolished in 1967. Bexhill West station building has survived and is now occupied by Sivyers Antique Emporium and Auction, along with Brief Encounters Cafe. The adjoining former refreshment rooms are now a pub and restaurant, and the engine shed forms part of the light industrial estate now occupying the former trackbed to the rear of the station along Beeching Road. The platforms have been demolished.

The building was listed at Grade II by English Heritage on 27 February 2013.  This status is given to "nationally important buildings of special interest".

Photographs

References

External links
Disused stations - Bexhill West

Disused railway stations in East Sussex
Former South Eastern Railway (UK) stations
Railway stations in Great Britain opened in 1902
Railway stations in Great Britain closed in 1917
Railway stations in Great Britain opened in 1919
Railway stations in Great Britain closed in 1964
Beeching closures in England
Grade II listed buildings in East Sussex
Grade II listed railway stations
Bexhill-on-Sea